Frederick Hall (1855 – 18 April 1933) was a British Liberal Party or Lib-Lab then Labour Party politician who was an official of the Yorkshire Miners' Association.

Background
He was a son of John and Hannah Hall. He was educated at night-school for one year, and self-taught subsequently. In 1878 he married Ann Maria Edwards, a daughter of William Edwards.

Work and Trade Unionism
At the age of 9 he started working in a coal mine. He worked at the Aldwarke Main Colliery, Rotherham. In 1878 he became a check-weighman. In the same year he became Treasurer of the Yorkshire Miners' Association. In 1898 he stopped working as a check-weighman. In 1904 he stopped being the Association's Treasurer and became its Miners' Agent.

Politics
He was elected to the West Riding of Yorkshire County Council, serving for 12 years. He took an interest in local education, serving for 18 years as a member of the Rawmarsh School Board, including a period of 9 years as its Chairman.

He was the Liberal candidate for the Normanton Division of West Yorkshire at the 1905 Normanton by-election. He was elected to the House of Commons at the by-election, following the death of the sitting Member of Parliament (MP), William Parrott. In 1909 the Miners Federation of Great Britain instructed him and all other MPs sponsored by their local miners associations to take the Labour Party whip and seek re-election in 1910 as a Labour Party candidate, which he did. He served as a Justice of the Peace in the West Riding of Yorkshire. He was a Grand Master of the British United Order of Oddfellows. In 1915 his YMA colleague John Wadsworth re-took the Liberal whip in the House of Commons, and there is some evidence that Hall may have done likewise. He contested the 1918 General Election as a Labour Party candidate. After the 1918 General Election he again took the Labour party whip, and soon after he became a Labour Whip. He continued as Whip, serving as a Government Whip while Labour were in office in 1924. He represented the constituency for 28 years, until his death in 1933, aged 78.

References

External links 
 

Liberal Party (UK) MPs for English constituencies
Labour Party (UK) MPs for English constituencies
Liberal-Labour (UK) MPs
Members of the Parliamentary Committee of the Trades Union Congress
Miners' Federation of Great Britain-sponsored MPs
UK MPs 1900–1906
UK MPs 1906–1910
UK MPs 1910
UK MPs 1910–1918
UK MPs 1918–1922
UK MPs 1922–1923
UK MPs 1923–1924
UK MPs 1924–1929
UK MPs 1929–1931
UK MPs 1931–1935
1855 births
1933 deaths